Presidential elections were held in Austria on 24 April 2016, with a second round run-off on 22 May 2016. However, the results of the second round were annulled and a re-vote took place on 4 December 2016.

Incumbent President Heinz Fischer had served two terms and was not eligible to be elected for a third successive term. In the first round of the election, Norbert Hofer of the Freedom Party of Austria (FPÖ) historically received the most votes. Alexander Van der Bellen, a member of the Austrian Greens contesting as an independent, placed second, also a historic success for a member of the Greens. The candidates of the two governing parties, the Social Democratic and Austrian People's parties, placed fourth and fifth respectively, behind independent Irmgard Griss in third place, which led to a government crisis and the resignation of Chancellor Werner Faymann. Since no candidate received a majority of the vote, Hofer and Van der Bellen went head-to-head in the second round in May. This was the first time since the Second World War that an Austrian president had not been backed by either the People's or the Social Democratic party. During the run-off, Van der Bellen defeated Hofer on 23 May 2016 after the postal ballots had been counted.

On 1 July, the results of the second round of voting were annulled after the results in 20 of the 117 administrative districts were challenged, and the Constitutional Court of Austria found that Austrian electoral law had been disregarded in 14 of them. The Court found that over 77,900 absentee votes were improperly counted too early, however without any indication of votes having been fraudulently manipulated. The second round re-vote was planned on 2 October, but was postponed to 4 December 2016.

Van der Bellen ultimately won the second round re-vote with 53.8% of the vote and a voter turnout of 74.2%. Hofer conceded the race to Van der Bellen when the result had become apparent shortly after polls closed. Van der Bellen was sworn in as the twelfth president of Austria on 26 January 2017.

Electoral system 
The President of Austria is directly elected by universal adult suffrage once every six years. The election is held under a two-round system; if no candidate receives more than 50% of votes cast in the first round, then a second ballot occurs in which only those two candidates who received the greatest number of votes in the first round may stand. The constitution grants the president the power to appoint the Chancellor and, by extension, federal cabinet ministers, Supreme Court justices, military officers, and most major bureaucrats. The president may dissolve the National Council. In practice, however, the president acts as a figurehead.

Candidates

Social Democratic Party (SPÖ)
The most likely candidate of the Social Democratic Party was considered to be Labour Minister Rudolf Hundstorfer, though President of the National Council Doris Bures, former Chancellor Franz Vranitzky and former undersecretary for EU affairs  were also mentioned. On 15 January 2016, Hundstorfer was officially announced as the SPÖ's candidate.

Austrian People's Party (ÖVP)
Justice Minister Wolfgang Brandstetter declined to stand on 26 December 2015. On 7 January 2016, ÖVP leader Reinhold Mitterlehner announced that Erwin Pröll, the Landeshauptmann of Lower Austria, would not be running. Josef Pühringer, Landeshauptmann of Upper Austria declined to stand on 8 January 2016, as did former European Commissioner Franz Fischler and Member of the European Parliament Othmar Karas. President of the Austrian Federal Economic Chamber Christoph Leitl only said he would not comment before the announcement by the party leadership on 10 January 2016. Controversial former chancellor Wolfgang Schüssel was briefly considered as a candidate, but he also declined. Other names mentioned were former Science Minister and university professor , former Foreign Minister Ursula Plassnik and former Raiffeisen Zentralbank manager . On 10 January 2016, former first president of the National Council Andreas Khol was announced as the ÖVP's candidate.

Freedom Party of Austria (FPÖ)
Norbert Hofer, who serves as the Third President of the National Council, had been considered the most likely Freedom Party of Austria (FPÖ) candidate. On 28 December 2015 he said that he considered himself too young for the office and that he would prefer his party to pick someone else as its candidate. Other possible candidates included President of the Austrian Court of Audit Josef Moser, former Mayor of Vienna's 1st district Ursula Stenzel, ombudsman Peter Fichtenbauer and possibly party leader Heinz-Christian Strache himself. As of 11 January 2016, Fichtenbauer, Moser and Stenzel continued to be the most likely candidates. Strache announced on 13 January 2016 that he would not be running himself, and that it was still open whether the FPÖ would nominate anyone at all. In mid-January, Vienna Vice-Mayor Johann Gudenus and former FPÖ leader and former Vice-Chancellor Norbert Steger were also mentioned as possible candidates. On 19 January 2016, author and Middle East/migration pundit Karin Kneissl was mentioned as being recruited by the FPÖ to run, which she quickly declined.

On 20 January 2016, media reported that Gudenus had been internally selected as the FPÖ's candidate; on 26 January 2016, reports claimed Stenzel would be announced on 28 January 2016 as the FPÖ's candidate. Amid strong FPÖ-internal dissent, there were rumours the party leadership had been forced to reconsider, and that Hofer was now the most likely option, after all, with Gudenus also still in play. Commentators opined that the backtracking was a notable defeat for Strache. Hofer was announced as the FPÖ's candidate on 28 January 2016.

The Greens – The Green Alternative
In early January 2016, it was announced that former Greens party leader Alexander Van der Bellen would not be running as the official Greens' candidate, as that would have required a party convention decision; this was also framed as an attempt to put personality above party politics in the election. Van der Bellen announced his candidacy on 8 January 2016 in a YouTube video. NEOS – The New Austria and Liberal Forum leader Strolz stated that they would consider giving him the same support as Griss, depending on the same kind of hearing she went through.

Other candidates
Independent candidate Irmgard Griss, a former Supreme Court of Justice judge and its president, declared her candidacy on 17 December 2015. She presented her candidacy to the Freedom Party of Austria and NEOS, but both declined to endorse her. NEOS said they would support Griss and any other independent candidates indirectly, and voiced their concerns over the strong partisan politicization of the presidential office and the election campaign. NEOS leader Matthias Strolz stated on 9 February 2016 that NEOS might also support Van der Bellen, voicing his preference for a run-off election between Griss and Van der Bellen.

Richard Lugner, society figure, businessman and candidate for president in 1998, was reported to be considering running again, and stated on 8 February 2016 that he would very likely be running. He announced his candidacy on 10 February 2016, citing a poll carried out for him by the Humaninstitut which showed him on 10% (behind Van der Bellen on 27%, Hundstorfer on 18%, Hofer on 17%, Griss at 15% and Khol on 13%).

Martin Wabl, who had attempted to run in 1998, 2004 and 2010, but failed to gather the necessary number of signatures of support, said he would try to run again. Ulrich Habsburg-Lothringen, whose initiative to repeal the so-called Habsburg Paragraph, which had precluded members of the former ruling house from running for president, proved successful in 2011, stated he would like to run for president, but only if a political party decided to support him. Adrien Jean-Pierre Luxemburg-Wellenstein announced on 8 December 2015 he would run for president. Author  announced her run on 12 January 2016. Krems activist Franz Stieger announced his candidacy on 13 January 2016. Further independent candidates who announced their runs were Gustav Jobstmann, Thomas Unden, Gernot Pointner, Alois Merz, Georg Zakrajsek of the Interessengemeinschaft Liberales Waffenrecht Österreich, Karin Kolland,  of the EU Exit Party, Thomas Reitmayer of the Austrian version of the satirical political party Die PARTEI, Erich Körner-Lakatos and Peter Fetz.

At the half-way point for collecting signatures, it appeared that only the five major candidates and possibly Lugner and Awadalla had a chance of making the ballot.

Signatures
Griss was the first candidate to submit the necessary number of signatures (6,000) at the Interior Ministry, submitting 7,851 on 8 March 2016. By 11 March 2016, she had collected over 10,000 signatures. By 16 March 2016, two days before the deadline, the five main candidates had submitted their signatures, with Awadalla still having outside chances to make it and Lugner likely to fall short.

Surprising many observers, Marschall announced on 17 March 2016 that he had gathered the required number of signatures, though it was unclear whether he would be using the grace period of three days to reach the required number; Lugner also submitted his bid, but falling short of the required signatures, promising to submit the remaining number within the grace period. Besides these two, only the five main candidates submitted successful bids. On 19 March 2016, it was announced that the five main candidates had submitted the necessary number of signatures, and that neither Lugner nor Marschall had (so far). As expected by many analysts, Lugner claimed on 22 March 2016 to have made up the deficit, with Marschall clearly failing, having gathered only 1,150 signatures.

Voter statistics

According to the federal election commission, 6,382,507 Austrian citizens aged 16 or over are eligible to vote in the presidential election. Compared with the 2010 presidential election, the number of eligible voters increased by 26,707 – or 0.4% . There are 3,301,628 women and 3,080,879 men eligible to vote. 42,830 Austrians living abroad are also included in these numbers as being eligible to vote. In the first round of voting, 641,975 absentee ballots were issued – up from 373,902 in 2010. For the runoff, a record number of 885,437 absentee ballots were issued.

Eligible voters by state:

 Burgenland: 232,028
 Carinthia: 440,435
 Lower Austria: 1,283,676
 Upper Austria: 1,099,420
 Salzburg: 393,583
 Styria: 969,487
 Tyrol: 540,132
 Vorarlberg: 269,940
 Vienna: 1,153,806

Opinion polls

Results

Hofer, the Freedom Party candidate, led in the first round of the election on 24 April with an unexpectedly strong 35 percent of the vote. Van der Bellen came second with 21 percent, and since Hofer failed to gain an absolute majority the election proceeded to a run-off vote between the two, scheduled for 22 May. Independent Irmgard Griss came third with 19 percent, while Khol and Hundstorfer, representing the two governing parties, polled 11 percent each. Johannes Pollak described the result as a "political earthquake" and the Financial Times reported an "historic upset".

The provisional result on 22 May gave Hofer 51.9% of the votes, not counting the absentee ballots, which were expected to favour Van der Bellen. Hence the outcome remained unclear pending the counting of absentee ballots on Monday 23 May. The final result, including absentee ballots, gave Van der Bellen 50.3%. He was to succeed Heinz Fischer as president on 8 July 2016. This was the first time a phenomenon akin to blue shift was widely discussed publicly in an Austrian election.

The Kronen Zeitung reported some election irregularities, such as a 146.9% turnout in Waidhofen an der Ybbs and another impossible result in Linz. According to the head of the Interior Ministry's election department, Robert Stein, the results (which were simply a reporting error) were to be corrected in the official results. FPÖ officials highlighted the discrepancies, but Hofer dismissed any suggestion of electoral fraud.

On 8 June the FPÖ announced that they would contest the outcome in the Constitutional Court. Between 20 and 23 June the Constitutional Court questioned some 90 witnesses, mostly election officials from district election commissions. A ruling by the Constitutional Court was expected before 8 July, determining whether to organize a repeat vote in certain regions. Because of the complexity of the FPÖ's lawsuit, it also had been possible that ruling could come after 8 July. As a consequence, Alexander Van der Bellen's inauguration was to be postponed until a later date.

On 1 July the Constitutional Court declared the second round of the election annulled, requiring a repeat of the election. The three presidents of the National Council (Doris Bures – SPÖ, Karlheinz Kopf – ÖVP, Norbert Hofer – FPÖ) were designated to collectively serve as Acting presidents of Austria, starting after President Heinz Fischer's term ended on 8 July and until the inauguration of the new President.

First round results by state, district and municipality

Second round results by state, district and municipality (annulled)

Second round (re-run) results by state, district and municipality

Result cancelled

On 8 June, FPÖ chairman Heinz-Christian Strache brought a 152-page appeal to the Constitutional Court. Strache claimed that more than 30,000 votes had been prematurely tallied, more than 50,000 votes had been counted by unauthorized personnel, and over 500,000 ballots were invalid. Other charges included minors and non-citizens having been allowed to vote. The Austrian Interior Ministry acknowledged some irregularities but said that the number of votes affected was not enough to overturn the results. "There was sloppiness", said Interior Minister Wolfgang Sobotka.

Counsel for Van der Bellen argued that the irregularities would have had only an "insignificant" impact on results, while lawyers for the FPÖ said they could have affected the results of the election. But on 1 July, since Hofer had lost to Van der Bellen by 30,863 votes and the Court found that more than twice that number (77,926) had been affected by breaches of the electoral code, The Constitutional Court ordered that the second round be held again. Noting the irregularities, the Court said in a statement: "It is completely clear to the Constitutional Court that laws regulating an election must be rigorously applied ... This must rule out abuse and manipulations."

Before the Court's ruling, Van der Bellen was scheduled to be sworn in as president on 9 July. Elections were set for 2 October 2016. Until then, outgoing Austrian president Heinz Fischer would be replaced on an interim basis by the three presidents of the National Council, a "National President Council", of which Hofer is the third member. Van der Bellen said that Austrians were "shocked and unsettled" by the Court's ruling, but that he expected to win a second time.

On 12 September the Federal Minister of the Interior, Wolfgang Sobotka, announced that due to faulty glue in the voting envelopes, the rerun of the second round was postponed until 4 December 2016. He also said that Austrian law allowed the election to be postponed only in case of death of a candidate, therefore the decision had to be made by parliament. The delay also allowed for some young Austrians who turned 16 after May to vote in the rerun. FPÖ Chairman Heinz-Christian Strache criticized postponing the elections, claiming it was done by political opponents because Hofer was doing well in the polls.

See also
List of annulled elections
Blue shift (politics) an effect observed in the first runoff

References

External links

Austria
President
Annulled elections
Presidential elections in Austria
Austria
Austria
Austria